The 2011 Prince Edward Island Scotties Tournament of Hearts was held Jan. 27–31 in at the Cornwall Curling Club in Cornwall, Prince Edward Island. The winning team of Suzanne Birt defeated the defending champions, team Kathy O'Rourke and represented Prince Edward Island at the 2011 Scotties Tournament of Hearts in Charlottetown, Prince Edward Island. Birt's team finished the round robin with a record of 6–5, just missing the tiebreaker.

Teams

Standings

A event

B event

C event

Playoffs

Results

Draw 1
January 27, 6:00 PM

Draw 2
January 28, 11:00 AM

Draw 3
January 28, 4:00 PM

A Final
January 28, 4:00 PM

Draw 4
January 29, 1:30 PM

Draw 5
January 29, 6:30 PM

B Final
January 29, 6:30 PM

Draw 6
January 30, 1:30 PM

C Final
January 30, 6:30 PM

Championship Round 1 
January 31, 1:30 PM

Championship Round 2 
January 31, 6:30 PM

** O'Rourke must beat Birt twice in order to win the Championship

References

Prince Edward Island Scotties Tournament Of Hearts, 2011
Prince Edward Island
Prince Edward Island Scotties Tournament of Hearts
Curling competitions in Prince Edward Island
Cornwall, Prince Edward Island